Below are the squads for the 22nd Arabian Gulf Cup in Saudi Arabia, held in 2014. Caps and goals are correct prior to the tournament.

Group A

Saudi Arabia
Coach:  Juan Ramón López Caro

Yemen
Coach:  Miroslav Soukup

Bahrain
Coach:  Adnan Hamad
Akr

Qatar
Coach:  Djamel Belmadi

Group B

United Arab Emirates
Coach:  Mahdi Ali

Iraq
Coach:  Hakeem Shaker

Kuwait
Coach:  Jorvan Vieira

Oman
Coach:  Paul Le Guen

References

squads